Andy Dekaney High School is a public secondary school located at 22351 Imperial Valley Drive and Bammel Road in unincorporated Harris County, Texas, United States, with a ZIP code of 77073.

Dekaney serves a small portion of Houston and sections of unincorporated Harris County. Dekaney serves the communities of Cranbrook, Glen Abbey, and Remington Ranch.

The school, which serves grades 9 through 12, is a part of the Spring Independent School District.

History
Dekaney High School, which opened in 2007, is named after Andy Dekaney, a former school district board member. It opened because too many students attended Westfield High School.

In 2015 the school administration announced that it would create "small learning communities" within Dekaney in order to improve academic performance, and each would have a dedicated section of the school.
This plan was discontinued starting with the 2017-2018 school year.

In February 2017 the district proposed redrawing the attendance boundaries of its high schools; this would take effect in the 2020-2021 school year. The district also plans to establish one ninth grade center for each comprehensive high school. According to the proposed 2020-2021 high school map, the eastern portion of the Spring census-designated place will be reassigned from Spring High School to Dekaney High. The school district delayed the rezoning at least until after the 2021-2022 school year due to the COVID-19 pandemic in Texas, as it determines how the pandemic changed student enrollment patterns in Spring ISD.

Academic performance
The school received the Texas Education Agency (TEA) ratings of "academically unacceptable" or "improvement required", the lowest rankings, in 2008, 2011, 2013, and 2017. The school received a rating of "not rated" in lieu of "improvement required" in 2018 due to the impact of Hurricane Harvey.

Nora Olabi of The Spring Observer wrote in 2015 that Dekaney "has struggled to maintain high academic standards."

For the 2018-2019 school year, the school received a D grade from the Texas Education Agency, with an overall score of 69 out of 100. The school received a D grade in two domains, Student Achievement (score of 65) and School Progress (score of 69), and a C grade in Closing the Gaps (score of 70). The school did not receive any of the seven possible distinction designations.

Student discipline
In 2012 Steve Jansen of the Houston Press reported that the school had student discipline issues.

Student body
In the 2018-2019 school year, there were 2,141 students. 53.8% were African American, 1.1% were Asian, 41.8% were Hispanic, 1.0% were American Indian, 0.7% were Pacific Islander, 1.3% were White, and 0.3% were two or more races. 57.5% of students were economically disadvantaged, 18.9% were English Language Learners, and 8.9% received Special Education services.

In 2012 the school had 2,799 students, with 61.6% being black, 32.9% being Hispanic or Latino, 2.9% being Asian, and 1.7% being non-Hispanic White. 73.6% were classified as from low income backgrounds.

Clubs and organizations
 Skills USA
 Skills Culinary Arts
 Dekaney Choir
 Wildcat Band
 Wildcat Wire
 Blue Prints Yearbook
 Student Council
 DHS Cheerleaders
 Dekaney Diamonds
 Chess Club
 NJROTC
 Christian Club
 Future Farmers of America
 Thespian Society
 Dekaney Colorguard
 Teen Court
 HOSA
 Dekaney Fit Club
 DECA

Feeder schools
Middle schools
 Bammel Middle School
 Rickey C. Bailey Middle School
 Edwin M. Wells Middle School
 Stelle Claughton Middle School
 Twin Creeks  Middle School
 Dr. Edward Roberson Middle School
 Dueitt Middle School
 Springwoods Village Middle School
Elementary schools
 Bammel
 Beneke
 Clark Primary
 Clark Intermediate
 Cooper
 Heritage
 Lewis
 Link
 Meyer
 Ponderosa
 Reynolds (Oak Creek)
 Thompson
 Booker
 Salyers

Notable alumni
 Trey Williams, former NFL player
Joshuah Bledsoe, NFL Safety for the New England Patriots

References

External links
 Dekaney High School
 
 DHS Library
 Dekaney Wildcat Band and Colorguard
 Dekaney Choir
 Dekaney football team

Spring Independent School District high schools
Educational institutions established in 2007
2007 establishments in Texas